Lydia Folger Fowler (May 5, 1823 – January 26, 1879) was a pioneering American physician, professor of medicine, and activist.  She was the second American woman to earn a medical degree (after Elizabeth Blackwell) and one of the first women in medicine and a prominent women in science.

Family life
Lydia Folger was born in Nantucket, Massachusetts, in 1823, to Gideon and Eunice Macy Folger, a historic Massachusetts family descended from Peter Foulger (1618–1690). Lydia was the great-great-great-great granddaughter of Peter Foulger and Mary Morrill Foulger, through them she was the first cousin four times removed of Benjamin Franklin. Other notable family members included her extended cousins Lucretia Coffin Mott and Maria Mitchell and her paternal aunt Phebe Folger Coleman. Lydia was also a member of the Starbuck whaling family of Nantucket through her paternal grandmother Elizabeth Starbuck Folger (April 13, 1738 - 1821). Her mother was notably a member of the Macy family of Nantucket whose descendants would later found Macy's department stores.

Folger married Lorenzo Niles Fowler, a phrenologist, on September 19, 1844. Lydia Folger Fowler also gave herself the nickname of "Mrs. L. N. Fowler" to incorporate the initials of her husband into her name.
She met Lorenzo at the house of her paternal uncle. That uncle,  Walter Folger, Jr., an "eccentric and famous astronomer-navigator in Nantucket". Lorenzo  and his brother, Orson Squire Fowler, were well-known phrenologists; the New York Times noted in his obituary that "Prof. Fowler examined the heads of many distinguished men, among them Charles Dickens, Edgar Allan Poe, William Cullen Bryant, Baron Rothschild, Li Hung Chang, and Sir Henry Irving."

Lydia and Lorenzo had three daughters.  Two daughters, Amelia (b. 1846) and Lydia (b. 1850), died young. The third daughter, Jessie Allen Fowler (b. 1856 or 1860) was also a phrenologist. Jessie Fowler was the honorary secretary of the British Women's Temperance Association, and succeeded her mother in that position.

Education
Folger attended the Wheaton Female Seminary (Massachusetts) when she was 16 years old, and began teaching there in 1842 at the age of 20.  Lydia Folger and Lorenzo Fowler would attend conferences and lecture tours together. Lydia Folger would generally address female audiences. This time also marked the beginning of her writing career, as she published her first two books in 1847: Familiar Lessons on Physiology and Familiar Lessons on Phrenology. Lydia Folger Fowler's wrote her two-volume work as  a way to teach other women how to teach phrenology to children. Lydia gave many presentations where she would direct teachers and parents on how to teach their children to know themselves, as she believed children could work towards self-improvement with guidance.
After establishing a lecturing and writing career, she began medical school and earned an M.D. from Central Medical College in Syracuse, New York in 1850, one of eight women entering the first coed medical school in the country. Fellow students included Myra King Merrick and Sarah Adamson Dolley.  At the time, the eclectic medical school was the only school to offer admission to women. Eclectic medicine became popular with those seeking to avoid the harsher methods of then-current professional medicine, such as bloodletting.

She became an appointed professor of obstetrics and diseases of women and children at Central Medical College. Central Medical College then dissolved in 1852. Lydia Folger Fowler graduated as only the second woman in America to earn a medical degree, following Elizabeth Blackwell in 1849.  Fowler was, in fact, the first American-born woman to earn a medical degree, and also the first woman to appear before a male medical society.

Career and professional involvement

She then went on to practice medicine in New York from 1852 to 1860, and later joined the faculty of Rochester Eclectic Medical College, becoming the first woman professor in a professional American medical school. During her time practicing, she conducted many gynecological exams and held her own surgery practice geared towards homeopathic practices. In 1862, Fowler taught midwifery at the New York Hygeio-Therapeutic College. Lydia practiced medicine with the outlook that science could improve female roles as children's caretakers.  She used the knowledge gained through her medical education to help others overcome the obstacles women faced when working in the medical field.

Folger was active in women's rights organizations, and participated in the Seneca Falls Convention and presided over the Women's Grand Temperance Demonstration in Metropolitan Hall.  Elizabeth Cady Stanton later dedicated The History of Woman Suffrage (1881) to Folger.  Fowler also frequently lectured to audiences, primarily women, on matters of hygiene and health. The New York Tribune in 1855 described one of Fowler's lectures, to a P.T. Barnum-sponsored program on motherhood:

 She was dressed in a very broadly striped silk, which was anything but a bloomer. Her hair was done up in a French twist with curls in front. Her face is pleasant, she has sunny blue eyes and a sweet mouth. She waved an elegantly embroidered handkerchief as she read her lecture. Quite a number of the little exhibited [babies] were present and contributed their full share to the festivities, at times almost drowning her voice, which is scarcely strong enough for a lecturer.

The Fowlers moved to London in 1863, and Fowler became active in the British Women's Temperance Association, as well as continuing her work practicing medicine and teaching women about health, education, and parenting.  Fowler became ill in late 1878 and died on January 26, 1879.  Fowler is buried on the eastern side of Highgate Cemetery in London (Plot 23071).

Publications

Young adult audience
 Familiar Lessons on Physiology (1847, Fowler and Wells)
 Familiar Lessons on Phrenology (1847, Fowler and Wells)
 Familiar Lessons on Astronomy (1848)

Treatises and lectures on health
 The Pet of the Household and How to Save It:  Twelve Lectures on Physiology (1865) (a childrearing manual comprising a dozen of Fowler's lectures on childcare)
 Woman, Her Destiny and Maternal Relations; Or, Hints to the Single and Married (1864) (a feminist treatise)
 How to talk – the Tongue and the Language of Nature (1864)
 How to Preserve the Skin and Increase Personal Beauty (1864)
 How, When, and Where to Sleep (186?)
 The Brain and Nervous System: How to Secure their Healthy Action (186?)
 The Eye and Ear, and How to Preserve Them (186?)
 How to Secure a Healthy Spine and Vigorous Muscles (1864).

Fiction and poetry
 Nora: The Lost and Redeemed (1863 temperance novel)
 Heart-Melodies (1870 book of poetry)

References

Further reading

 "Lydia Folger Fowler", Encyclopædia Britannica
 John B. Blake, "Lydia Folger Fowler", Notable American Women 1607–1950: A Biographical Dictionary, Cambridge: Radcliffe College, 1971, Volume 2, pp. 654–655
 Esther Pohl Lovejoy, Women Doctors of the World (1957), pp. 8–21.
 Robert McHenry, ed., "Lydia Folger Fowler", Famous American Women: A Biographical Dictionary from Colonial Times to the Present, Springfield, MA: G. & C. Merriam Co., 1980,  Volume 2, p. 139
 "Fowlers", Herringshaw's Encyclopedia of American Biography of the Nineteenth Century, Chicago: American Publishers' Association, 1901, p. 277
 The Daisy: A Journal of Pure Literature (1879 obituary)
 "Lydia Folger Fowler" (obituary), Englishwoman's Review, February 15, 1879, pp. 82–83.
 "Noted Phrenologist Dead: Lorenzo N. Fowler Succumbs to a Paralyzing Stroke" (obituary), New York Times, September 4, 1896.
 "Wheaton graduate becomes doctor", Wheaton College
 Peggy Baker, "The ‘First Family’ of Phrenology", August 2004
 John Davies, Phrenology: Fad and Science (1955)
 Alice Dixon, "A Lesser-Known Daughter of Nantucket: Lydia", Historic Nantucket, Winter 1993/1994 (Vol. 41, No. 4; incorrectly labeled Vol. 43, No. 4), p. 60–62.
 Ruth Clifford Engs, "The Fowlers", Clean Living Movements: American Cycles of Health Reform, Westport, CT: Greenwood Publishing Group, 2001, pp. 71–72
 William Coleman Folger, "Folger Family" (Gideon Folger) MS., New England Hist. Genealogical Society
 Marion Sauerbier, "Lydia Folger Fowler", The Crooked Lake Review, October 7, 1988.
 Elizabeth Silverthorne, et al., "Lydia Folger Fowler", Women Pioneers in Texas Medicine, 1997,  p. XXII
 Elizabeth Cady Stanton, History of Woman Suffrage (1881), pp. 178–181, 476–478, 489–492, 519n, 548n
 
 Madeleine B. Stern, The Phrenological Fowlers (Norman, Oklahoma: University of Oklahoma Press, 1971)
 Frederick Clayton Waite, Dr. Lydia Folger Fowler : The Second Woman to Receive the Degree of Doctor of Medicine in the United States, Annals of Medical History, v.4, n.3, pp. 290–297 (May 1932) (New York, N.Y. : Hoeber, 1932)
 Sue Young Homeopathy, "Lydia Folger Fowler"

1822 births
1879 deaths
American women's rights activists
American temperance activists
Burials at Highgate Cemetery
19th-century American women writers
19th-century American writers
British Women's Temperance Association people
19th-century American women physicians
19th-century American physicians
People from Nantucket, Massachusetts
Wheaton College (Massachusetts) alumni